Joanne Cuthbertson  was the chancellor of the University of Calgary in Alberta from 2006 until 2010.

References

Year of birth missing (living people)
Living people
Canadian university and college chancellors
Canadian women academics
Members of the Order of Canada
Women academic administrators
Canadian academic administrators